Meet the Vamps is the debut studio album by British pop band The Vamps. It was initially released in Australia and New Zealand on 11 April 2014, and released in the United Kingdom through Virgin EMI Records on 14 April. The album includes the UK top-five singles "Can We Dance", "Wild Heart", "Last Night" and "Somebody to You".

The album received generally positive reviews from music critics. It debuted at number two in the United Kingdom and the Republic of Ireland, kept off number one in both countries by Caustic Love by Paolo Nutini. It was the 23rd best selling album in 2014 in the UK.

Background and promotion
After James McVey met Brad Simpson via YouTube in late 2011, the duo began working together on their debut album. They later met Tristan Evans and Connor Ball and became a four-piece. They signed a record deal with Mercury Records in November 2012. On 22 March 2014, The Vamps announced that their debut album would be called Meet the Vamps and would be released on 15 April 2014.

The Vamps embarked on their first ever UK headline tour in support of their debut studio album and played 14 dates across the country. They made the announcement via their Twitter account on 12 February 2014.

Singles
"Can We Dance" was released on 29 September 2013 as The Vamps' debut single and the lead single from the album. It had previously been on course to debut at number one on the UK Singles Chart, it eventually entered at number two, being beaten to the top spot by OneRepublic's "Counting Stars". The song has also peaked to number 17 in Australia and number 19 in New Zealand.
"Wild Heart" was released as the album's second single on 19 January 2014. The song peaked to number 3 in the UK.
"Last Night" was released as the third single on 6 April 2014, and peaked at number 2 on the UK Singles Chart.
A new version of "Somebody to You" which features Demi Lovato was released as the fourth UK single and The Vamps' debut single in the US on 18 May 2014, and peaked at number four on the UK Singles Chart.
A new version of "Oh Cecilia (Breaking My Heart)" which features Shawn Mendes was released as the fifth single from the album on 12 October 2014. The song peaked at number 9 on the UK Singles Chart. It is certified Silver in the UK.

Promotional singles
"Dangerous" was released as a promotional single on 14 April 2014.

Reception

Critical reception

The album received generally positive reviews from music critics. AllMusic critic Matt Collar noted that the album "showcases the group's high-energy mix of melodic pop and dance music." Lewis Corner of Digital Spy gave the album a positive review, stating, "...Meet packs a big enough pop punch to pierce through the oversaturated landscape and get itself noticed. They may have a lot of competition out there, but The Vamps have proven that they are more than capable to take on the challenge." Caroline Sullivan of The Guardian also gave the album a positive review. She said, "segments of Meet the Vamps are verifiably bandy", but also felt that "there are many moments when it would be hard to pick the Vamps out of a lineup alongside One Direction and Peter Andre (whose "Mysterious Girl" clearly provided much of the inspiration for "Girls on TV"). This is where their origins as a YouTube covers act are most evident, and the need for a voice of their own most felt." Virgin Media's Matthew Horton called the album "an appealing effort that adds something to the pop landscape".

Commercial performance
Meet the Vamps debuted at number two on the Irish Albums Chart, behind Paolo Nutini's Caustic Love. The same album kept it off the number one spot on the UK Albums Chart. It sold 47,160 in its first week, and was the 23rd biggest selling album of 2014. It has been certified Platinum by the British Phonographic Industry (BPI) for sales of over 300,000 copies.

In Australia, the album debuted at number three on the ARIA Charts, behind the Frozen soundtrack and The New Classic by Iggy Azalea. In the United States, the album debuted at  No. 40 on the Billboard 200 albums chart on its first week of release, with around 10,000 copies sold.  As of October 2015, the album has sold 51,000 copies in the US.

Track listing

Christmas Edition
Meet the Vamps: Christmas Edition was released on 1 December 2014. It includes eight Christmas songs, the original version of "Somebody To You" and a DVD of band performing live at Birmingham NIA on 5 October 2014. iTunes version includes only songs and not available in US store .

US version

Notes
 signifies a co-producer
 signifies an additional producer

Tour dates

Charts and certifications

Weekly charts

Year-end charts

Certifications

Release history

References

2014 debut albums
Mercury Records albums
Virgin EMI Records albums
The Vamps (British band) albums
Albums produced by TMS (production team)